This list of sailors includes any seagoing person who does not qualify for the list of sea captains. It includes both professional and amateur sailors.

Actors
Raymond Bailey, American actor, Milburn Drysdale, on The Beverly Hillbillies
Rupert Davies, British actor, title role on the BBC's Maigret
Peter Falk, American actor, Columbo
James Garner, American actor, Jim Rockford on The Rockford Files
Sterling Hayden, American actor and author, Gen. Jack D. Ripper in Dr. Strangelove
Jack Lord, American actor, Steve McGarret on Hawaii Five-O
Carroll O'Connor, American actor, Archie Bunker on All in the Family
Denver Pyle, American actor, Uncle Jesse Duke on The Dukes of Hazzard
George Sewell, English actor, Frank Cottam on The Detectives; steward
Frederick Treves, much loved English character actor with over a hundred credits in theatre, television, and film
Clint Walker, American actor, Cheyenne Bodie on Cheyenne
Jack Warden, American actor, Emmy Award-winning, Academy Award-nominated

Comedians
Dave Broadfoot, Canadian comedian
George Roper, English stand-up comedian best known for work on television series The Comedians

Explorers
Erik the Red
Bjorn Ironside
Leif Erikson
Ali ibn al-Hassan Shirazi
James Cook, sub-Antarctic, Pacific, North America, apprenticed on a Whitby collier
Ernest Shackleton. Antarctic, was third mate in the Union-Castle Line

Labor leaders
Joseph Curran, American labor leader
 Richard Henry Dana Jr. (1815–1882), wrote Two Years Before the Mast
 Andrew Furuseth (1854–1938), merchant seaman and labour leader
 Shannon J. Wall, American merchant seaman and labor leader

Maritime industry
Captain John Bury, Canadian mariner involved in standardising international buoyage
Harry McNish, Scottish carpenter on Sir Ernest Shackleton's Imperial Trans-Antarctic Expedition
Jeremiah O'Brien, captain of the privateer Unity in the first battle of the Revolutionary War 
Herbert Pitman, third officer of the Titanic
John Wallace Thomas, Newfoundland captain made Commander of the Order of the British Empire for actions during a Luftwaffe attack
Louis Ernest Sola, Federal Maritime Commissioner and yachtsman

Military
Kingsmill Bates, British Distinguished Service Cross recipient
Philip Bent, Canadian recipient of the Victoria Cross
David Broadfoot, Scottish recipient of the George Cross
Lionel Crabb, British Royal Navy frogman who vanished during a reconnaissance mission first in 1956
Jacques Félix Emmanuel Hamelin, French Baron and rear admiral of the Navy; was a helmsman early in his career
Peter Horsley, British Air Marshal
Lawrence Joel, Vietnam War Medal of Honor recipient
John Paul Jones, American naval officer
"Yank" Levy, Canadian soldier, military instructor and author of a manual on guerrilla warfare
Charles Andrew MacGillivary, Canadian Medal of Honor recipient
Kim Malthe-Bruun, member of the Danish resistance movement
Thomas McClelland, American naval officer
George S. Patton, American general
George H. O'Brien Jr., Medal of Honor recipient in Korean War
Arthur Phillip, British naval officer, colonial administrator, Governor of New South Wales, and founder of the city of Sydney
William Sanders, New Zealander recipient of the Victoria Cross
Miguel Grau Seminario, Peruvian naval officer and hero of the Naval Battle of Angamos
John Young, naval officer in American Revolutionary War

Musicians and composers
Ken Colyer, British jazz trumpeter
Suezenne Fordham, American jazz pianist
Eric Griffiths, Welsh guitarist in the original lineup of The Quarry Men
Woody Guthrie, musician and songwriter, wrote "This Land Is Your Land"
Chick Henderson, English singer in the 1930s and 1940s, "Begin the Beguine"
Cisco Houston, American folk singer
Ferlin Husky, American country-pop singer, hit number one with "Wings of a Dove"
Nelson Riddle, American bandleader, arranger and orchestrator, "C'mon... Get Happy"
Francisco Gabilondo Soler, Mexican composer of children's songs, "Cri-Cri, El Grillito Cantor"
Dave Van Ronk, American folk singer nicknamed the "Mayor of MacDougal Street"
Ted Weems, American bandleader and musician, directed the Merchant Marine Band
Russ Conway, English pianist

Notorious
William Colepaugh, Nazi spy in World War II
George Hennard, American mass murderer who claimed twenty-three victims at Luby's Cafeteria in Killeen, Texas
Fritz Sauckel, Nazi war criminal
Duncan Scott-Ford, British merchant seaman hanged for treachery in World War II
Perry Smith, made famous in Truman Capote's non-fiction novel In Cold Blood

Politics and activism
Alvin Baldus, former Democratic member of Congress
Traian Băsescu, President of Romania, inaugurated in 2004
Gordon Canfield, Republican congressman from New Jersey
Alfonso J. Cervantes, forty-third Mayor of Saint Louis, Missouri
Frederick Arthur Cobb,  Labour Party politician in the United Kingdom
Mark Croucher, Director of Communications for the UK Independence Party, pub landlord, journalist, former radio officer
Arthur Davidson, British Labour Party Member of Parliament
Jim Folsom,  Democratic Governor of the U.S. state of Alabama
Ian Glachan, Australian politician, member of the New South Wales Legislative Assembly
Brian Haw, British peace activist
Harry Haywood, a leading African American member of both the Communist Party of the United States (CPUSA) and the Communist Party of the Soviet Union (CPSU)
John Horner, British firefighter, trade unionist and politician
 Emmanuel Iheanach, Minister of Federal Republic of Nigeria, Master Mariner, sea captain
Piet de Jong, Prime Minister of the Netherlands
Wayne Mapp, New Zealand politician
Alfred von Niezychowski, Polish noble, German Count, author and lecturer, and American politician
Jack O'Dell, prominent African-American member of the U.S. civil rights movement
Albert Owen, Welsh politician, Labour Party MP for Ynys Môn
John Prescott, British Labour Party politician, Deputy Prime Minister, First Secretary of State and Member of Parliament, a steward and waiter
Joseph Resnick, Democratic congressman from New York
Montfort Stokes, Democratic Senator
John S. Watson, New Jersey politician 
Terry Wynn, retired Labour Party Member of the European Parliament for North West England

Producers
John Clark, English actor, director, producer, and ex-husband of Lynn Redgrave
John Kenley, former American theatrical producer
Oliver Stone, three-time Academy Award-winning American film director and screenwriter

Radio industry
Dave Cash, British disk jockey
James Redmond, pioneer of modern public service broadcasting in the United Kingdom
Tommy Vance, British pop radio broadcaster
Brad “Boom Boom” Barrett, Radio Broadcaster and show host as well as Director of Programming in Honolulu Hawaii At KSSK, KKUA, as well As other radio stations.

Real estate
John Q. Hammons, American businessman and resort developer

Science, engineering, and architecture
Patrick Young Alexander, British aeronautical pioneer
Francis Buchanan-Hamilton, Scottish physician, geographer zoologist and botanist
Allan V. Cox, American chemist and geologist
Norman Jaffe, American architect
D. Holmes Morton, American physician specializing in genetic disorders

Social scientists
Douglass Cecil North, American economist and Nobel Prize winner

Sports
Samuel Albrecht, Brazilian swimmer
Bobby Atherton, Welsh international footballer
Jim Bagby Jr., major-league baseball pitcher
Fred Blackburn, English footballer and coach
Drew Bundini Brown, Muhammad Ali's assistant trainer and cornerman
Dan Devine, American football coach
Joe Gold, bodybuilding and fitness guru of Gold's Gym
Cornelius Johnson, American Olympic medal-winning high jumper
Charlie Keller, left fielder in Major League Baseball
Frank Sinkwich, American footballer, won 1942 Heisman Trophy, 1944 NFL MVP
 Agostino Straulino (1914–2004), Olympic champion and Italian admiral
Jim Thorpe, American Olympic athlete
Henk de Velde, Dutch seafarer known for his long solo voyages around the world
Matthew Webb, first person to swim the English Channel without the use of artificial aid

Visual arts
Richard Avedon, American photographer
Johnny Craig, American comic book artist
Paul Gauguin, French Post-Impressionist artist
Rockwell Kent, American painter
Joseph Stanley Kozlowski, American AB, portrait and watercolor artist
James Nachtwey, American photojournalist and war photographer
George Rodger, British photojournalist noted for work in Africa and death camps at Bergen-Belsen
Ken Russell, iconoclastic English film director
Ernie Schroeder, American comic book artist
Haskell Wexler, American Academy Award-winning cinematographer
Wally Wood, American comic book writer, artist and independent publisher

Writers and publishers
John Arthur Barry, Australian journalist and author
Peter Baynham, Welsh screenwriter; Academy Award-nominated; co-writer of Borat
John Blackburn, British novelist
Nathaniel Bowditch, author, The American Practical Navigator
E. S. Campbell, American author, broadcaster and radio officer
A. Bertram Chandler, Australian science fiction author of over 40 novels and 200 works of short fiction
Brian Cleeve, English writer and popular TV broadcaster
Olaudah Equiano, former slave turned abolitionist and writer of African descent 
Clare Francis, British novelist
Allen Ginsberg, poet, "Howl", "Kaddish"
David Hackworth, retired United States Army colonel and military journalist
Richard Henry Dana Jr., American author, Two Years Before the Mast
John L. Hess, American journalist
Herbert Huncke, American beat generation figure
Bob Kaufman, American Beat poet and surrealist
Nikos Kavvadias, Greek poet
Jack Kerouac, American author, On The Road
James Lennox Kerr, Scottish socialist author noted for his children's stories
Jack London, American author, Call of the Wild
Veeresh Malik, Indian businessman and writer
John Masefield, O.M., LL.D., Poet Laureate, sailing ship apprentice
Kevin McClory, Irish screenwriter, producer, and director, Never Say Never Again
Herman Melville, American author, Moby Dick
Charles Muñoz, American poet, novelist, publisher, and radio officer
Alun Owen, British screenwriter, wrote The Beatles' film A Hard Day's Night
Michael Page, British Australian novelist and author of the Encyclopedia of Things That Never Were
Donn Pearce, author of Cool Hand Luke
Dudley Pope, British writer of both nautical fiction and history
Richard Scott Prather, American mystery novelist
Otto Scott, American journalist and author
Hubert Selby Jr., American author
Joshua Slocum (1848–1909?), first single-handed circumnavigation of the world, 1895-1898
Gary Snyder, American poet
Lyle Stuart, controversial American publisher
Derek Turner, Irish magazine editor and freelance journalist
Mark Twain (born Samuel Clemens), author
Nedd Willard (1926–2018), writer and journalist
Charles Williams, writer of hardboiled crime fiction
Robin Wilson, American science fiction author and university president
Bernard Wolfe, American fiction writer

Other
Popeye (created 1929) cartoon fictional character created by Elzie Crisler Segar
Crispus Attucks (1723–1770), victim of the Boston Massacre
 Peter Blake (1944–2001), winner of the Whitbread Round the World Race, the America's Cup and the Jules Verne Trophy
 Chay Blyth (born 1940), completed the first westward single-handed non-stop circumnavigation of the world, 1971
 Jean-Charles de Borda (1733–1799), scientist and engineer working at sea
 William Harvey Carney (1842–1908), Civil War soldier, previously a sailor
 Russ Chauvenet (1920–2003), one of the founders of science fiction fandom; amateur sailor
 Sir Francis Chichester, completed the first single-handed circumnavigation of the world with just one port of call, 1966-1967
 Granville Conway, public servant, Presidential Medal for Merit recipient
 Harvey Cox, preeminent theologian and professor at Harvard Divinity School
 Donald Crowhurst, lost at sea during the Golden Globe race
 James Dougherty, first husband of Marilyn Monroe
 Michael Eavis, founder of the Glastonbury Festival
 David Fasold, salvage expert, self-proclaimed "arkologist"
 Charles Henry George Howard, 20th Earl of Suffolk, 13th Earl of Berkshire, apprentice on windjammer Mount Stewart
 Robin Knox-Johnston (born 1939), completed the first single-handed non-stop circumnavigation of the world, 1968-1969
 Sadie O. Horton, spent World War II working aboard a coastwise U.S. Merchant Marine barge, and posthumously received official veteran's status for her wartime service, becoming the first recorded female Merchant Marine veteran of World War II
 Samuel Leech (1798–1848), wrote of experiences in both the Royal Navy and US Navy
 Freddie Lennon, father of English musician John Lennon
 Ellen MacArthur, British sailor and round-the-world record holder
 Doris Miller (1919–1943), cook who fought back at Pearl Harbor
 Abdul Awal Mintoo, Bengali businessman and former President of the Federation of Bangladesh Chambers of Commerce and Industry
 Bernard Motissier (1925–1994), French yachtsman and author of books about his voyages and sailing
 Jacob Nagle (1762–1841), well-traveled seaman who wrote a journal
 Altineu Pires (?-?), Brazilian navigation teacher, sailing author 
 Jure Šterk (1937–2009), Slovenian round-the-world sailor and author of books about his voyages and sailing
 Joseph D. Stewart, Vice Admiral, Superintendent of the United States Merchant Marine Academy
 Paul Teutul Sr., American television personality
 Jordan Weisman, American game designer

See also 
Notable mariners
:Category:Sailors
:Category:Merchant navy
:Category:Water transport

References

Sailors